The Paraguay women's national field hockey team represent Paraguay in women's international field hockey competitions and is controlled by the Paraguayan Hockey Association, the governing body for field hockey in Paraguay.

Paraguay has never qualified for the Pan American Cup but they have participated once in the Pan American Games in 1995.

Tournament record

Pan American Games
1995 – 7th place

South American Games
2014 – 5th place
2018 – 5th place
2022 – 4th place

South American Championship
2003 – 4th place
2008 – 6th place
2010 – 5th place
2013 – 5th place
2016 – 4th place

Pan American Challenge
2011 – 4th place
2021 –

Hockey World League
2016–17 – Round 1

FIH Hockey Series
2018–19 – First round

See also
Paraguay men's national field hockey team

References

Americas women's national field hockey teams
National team
Field hockey